Amsa Amin is a retired Major General of the Bangladesh Army, a politician from Kurigram district and former ambassador.

Career 
Amin was a prosecutor in the court martial case over the assassination of Ziaur Rahman in 1981 when he was a colonel in Bangladesh Army.

Amin is the chairman of the Center for Security and Development Studies, a non-governmental organization. He is a retired major general of the Bangladesh Army and former ambassador.

He retired from the army and joined the Awami League in 2001. In 2003, he was elected president of the Kurigram district committee of the Awami League. He was defeated in the 8th parliamentary elections of 2001 by contesting from Kurigram-2 constituency with the nomination of Awami League. After that he joined Gono forum in 2018. He also lost the Kurigram-2 constituency in the eleventh parliamentary election.

He was the administrator of Kurigram district council.

References 

Living people
Year of birth missing (living people)
People from Kurigram District
Bangladeshi military personnel
Gano Forum politicians
Awami League politicians